José Pascoal Alrelio Jr (born October 20, 1988) is a Brazilian professional racing cyclist for the Scott–Marcondes Cesar–São José dos Campos team.

External links

1988 births
Living people
Brazilian male cyclists
Brazilian road racing cyclists
Place of birth missing (living people)
21st-century Brazilian people
20th-century Brazilian people